Taoyuan Township is a township in Daozhen Gelao and Miao Autonomous County, Guizhou, China. There are four minorities live in the town, Gelao, Miao, Tujia and Mongolian.

History
In history, it came under the jurisdiction of Zhongxin Town. It was incorporated as a town in 1993.

Administrative division
As of 2016, the township is divided into three villages:
 Taoyuan
 Qunyi
 Qingxi

Geography

The Furong River flow through the township.

Economy
The township's economy is based on nearby mineral resources and agricultural resources. There are more than 4 million tons of aluminum ore here. Other mineral resources are: iron, lead, copper, and silver.

References

Bibliography

Townships of Zunyi